Signe Kivi (born 24 February 1957 in Tallinn) is an Estonian textile artist and politician. She has been a member of the IX, X and XIV Riigikogu. From 1999 to 2002 she was the Minister of Culture.

In 1980 she graduated from the Estonian Academy of Arts in textile design.

From 1985 to 1991 she was an artist in art factory ARS. Since 1988 she has been a lecturer at the Estonian Academy of Arts, and since 1997 she has been a professor. Between 2005 and 2015 she was the rector of the Estonian Academy of Arts, and between 2017 and 2019 she was the director of Tartu Art Museum.

From 1998 to 2006, and again since 2014, she has been a member of the Estonian Reform Party.

References

1957 births
20th-century Estonian women artists
21st-century Estonian politicians
21st-century Estonian women artists
Academic staff of the Estonian Academy of Arts
Artists from Tallinn
Estonian Academy of Arts alumni
Estonian Reform Party politicians
Living people
Members of the Riigikogu, 1999–2003
Members of the Riigikogu, 2003–2007
Members of the Riigikogu, 2015–2019
Members of the Riigikogu, 2019–2023
Members of the Riigikogu, 2023–2027
Ministers of Culture of Estonia
Politicians from Tallinn
Recipients of the Order of the White Star, 4th Class